Musik, dans & party 11, also known as Vågar du så vågar jag, is a 1996 Sten & Stanley studio album. The album received a Grammis Award in the "Dansband of the Year" category.

Track listing
"Vågar du så vågar jag" (T. Gunnarsson - E. Lord)
"En gul undulat" ("Mockingbird") (I. Foxx - C. Foxx - M. Forsberg)
"Efteråt" (E. Rabbitt - H. Jansson)
"Vilken dagdröm" (A. Anderson - M. Porter - E. Lord)
"Hur é dé" (T. Gunnarsson - E. Lord)
"Ensam" ("Alene") (S. Storm Kristiansen - R. Rudberg - J. Jensen)
"Radio Luxembourg" (R. Lövland - T. Endresen - I. Forsman)
"Bortom bergen de blå" (T. Gunnarsson - E. Lord)
"Det kommer nog en dag" (B. Holly - J. Allison - N. Petty - K. Almgren)
"En på miljonen" (A. Persson - B. Alriksson)
"Du kan få allt det du drömmer om" (J. Cliff - I. Forsman)
"Jag vill visa dig stjärnorna" (R-M. Stråhle)
"Ingen är så underbar som du" (R. Lövland - O. Boröchstein - M. Forsberg)
"Jag vill vara din, Margareta" (J-E. Carlzon)

Charts

References 

1996 albums
Sten & Stanley albums